Griffith University light rail station is located on the corner of Engineering Drive and Parklands Drive in the Gold Coast suburb of Southport. The station is part of the Gold Coast's G:link light rail system, servicing the southern portion of the Gold Coast Health and Knowledge precinct. Griffith University light rail station is located alongside the southern end of Gold Coast campus of Griffith University and provides direct access to the Gold Coast Private Hospital. Several bus routes servicing the station provide connections to surrounding suburbs.

Location 
Below is a map of the Gold Coast Health and Knowledge precinct. The station can be identified by the grey marker.{
  "type": "FeatureCollection",
  "features": [
    {
      "type": "Feature",
      "properties": {},
      "geometry": {
        "type": "Point",
        "coordinates": [
          153.38462769985202,
          -27.963194321181405
        ]
      }
    }
  ]
}

Transport links 
Translink provides an integrated public transport network for the whole of South East Queensland. Surfside buslines under contract from Translink provides suburban bus services from Griffith University to the surrounding suburbs. The light rail service, known as the G:link runs from Broadbeach South to Helensvale via the key activity precincts of Southport and Surfers Paradise.

Below is a list of public transport connections available from Griffith University station.

External links 

 Translink
 G:link

References 

G:link stations
Railway stations in Australia opened in 2014
Southport, Queensland
Griffith University